Taganrog Museum of Architecture and Urbanism is a museum in the city of Taganrog, Russia. The building was designed by the architect Fyodor Schechtel's studio.

The building
The Taganrog Museum of Architecture and Urbanism is located in the former house of Sharonov, which represents a scaled-down model of the Moscow Yaroslavsky railway station and remains one of the best examples of Art Nouveau style architecture in Taganrog. The building was constructed in 1912 upon a project designed by Fyodor Schechtel's architectural studio. It is in the federal list of cultural heritage sites. 

The main value of the building is in its ceramic panels produced by the world-known Abramtsevo workshop based on sketches by such renowned artists as Nicholas Roerich, Mikhail Vrubel and Viktor Vasnetsov. Impressive majolica tiles presenting a variety of subjects cover the whole top of the building's front facade: "The Girl with a Flower", "Battle", "The Departure of Ladya Boats" and "Mermaid". 

Of special interest is the entrance gate adorned with faceted lion masks designed by Mikhail Vrubel. 

In 1977 the building was given to the Taganrog Arts & Culture Council for opening a branch of the Museum of local lore & history.

Museum collection
The new museum was established in 1981 to focus on the development of Taganrog's town-planning, historical buildings and its residents' modes of life from 17th century up to present times. Today it is part of Taganrog State Museum-Preserve of Literature, History and Architecture. It has an eleven-hall exposition that chronologically shows the architectural history of Taganrog and the life of its inhabitants from the city's foundation until nowadays. In addition to old postcards, photographs and maps, it showcases unique samples of furniture and arts and crafts.

The exhibition halls present objects from the Taganrog Museum Reserve, artworks of local artists, photography, modern interactive features, etc.

June 25, 2019 the museum was reopened with a new updated exhibit entitled "A Time-Lapse Portrait of the City".

Gallery

References 
 Taganrog Encyclopedia (Энциклопедия Таганрога), 2nd edition, Taganrog, 2003

External links 

Local museums in Russia
Museums in Taganrog
Houses completed in 1912
Art Nouveau architecture in Russia
Architecture museums
Museums established in 1981
Art Nouveau houses
Art Nouveau museum buildings
1981 establishments in the Soviet Union